Henry Hood may refer to:

 Henry Hood, 2nd Viscount Hood (1753–1836), English peer
 Henry Hood, 8th Viscount Hood  (born 1958), English peer and solicitor
 Harry Hood (footballer) (1944–2019), Scottish football player and manager